Little Grey Rabbit is the lead character in a classic, eponymous series of English children's books, written by Alison Uttley and illustrated by Margaret Tempest, except for the last five, illustrated by Katherine Wigglesworth. They appeared over a forty-year period up to the mid-1970s to great acclaim, and gave rise to a TV film series in 2000.

Characters
 Little Grey Rabbit – a modest, gentle, motherly soul, who lives with two friends, Hare and Squirrel
 Hare – a boastful fellow up for a little adventure, who cares about his friends
 Squirrel – a self-centred creature, who cares about her looks, but is affectionate
 Milkman Hedgehog – who milks the cows and distributes the milk to the animals
 Mrs Hedgehog – Milkman's wife
 Fuzzypeg – Milkman and Mrs Hedgehog's excitable son
 Bill and Tim Hedgehog – Fuzzypeg's cousins
 Brush – a wandering hedgehog
 Robin – the postman
 Water Rat
 Mrs Webster, a water vole
 Rat – a friend of the hens at the hen house
 Brock the Badger
 Fox – a troublesome sort, who plots to make a meal out one of the animals
 Speckledy Hen – who gives out eggs that she lays to her friends
 Moldy Warp – a mole
 Wise Owl – a source of information, but often grumpy if disturbed in the daytime

Books
The books marked* featured in the TV series of the year 2000.

Heinemann

Collins

Television series
In January 2000, Cosgrove Hall Films created an animated TV series consisting of 26 episodes based closely on the books, each 10 minutes in length.

Episode List

Cast

Crew

References

External links

Little Grey Rabbit at BCDB

British picture books
Series of children's books
Books about rabbits and hares
2000 British television series debuts
2000 British television series endings
2000s British animated television series
2000s British children's television series
ITV children's television shows
Treehouse TV original programming
Animated television series about rabbits and hares
Television series by Cosgrove Hall Films
Television shows produced by Harlech Television (HTV)